Piletocera is a genus of moths of the family Crambidae. The genus was first described by Julius Lederer in 1863.

Species
Piletocera aegimiusalis (Walker, 1859)
Piletocera aequalis Walker, 1866
Piletocera agathanalis Schaus, 1924
Piletocera albescens Rebel, 1915
Piletocera albicilialis Hampson, 1907
Piletocera albicinctata Hampson, 1897
Piletocera albilunata (Warren, 1896)
Piletocera albimixtalis Hampson, 1917
Piletocera albipictalis Hampson, 1907
Piletocera albiventralis Hampson, 1917
Piletocera analytodes Hampson, 1917
Piletocera argopis (Meyrick, 1886)
Piletocera atrata (Pagenstecher, 1900)
Piletocera batjianalis Strand, 1920
Piletocera bisignalis Hampson, 1917
Piletocera bistrigalis Hampson, 1917
Piletocera chloronota (Meyrick, 1889)
Piletocera chlorura (Meyrick, 1887)
Piletocera concisalis (Walker, 1859)
Piletocera costifascialis Hampson, 1917
Piletocera costipunctata (Warren, 1896)
Piletocera cumulalis Hampson, 1907
Piletocera cyclospila (Meyrick, 1886)
Piletocera denticostalis Hampson, 1907
Piletocera discalis Hampson, 1903
Piletocera discisignalis Hampson, 1917
Piletocera elongalis (Warren, 1896)
Piletocera epipercialis Hampson, 1897
Piletocera erebina Butler, 1886
Piletocera exuvialis (Snellen, 1890)
Piletocera flavalis Hampson, 1917
Piletocera flavidiscalis Hampson, 1917
Piletocera flavomaculalis Pagenstecher, 1884
Piletocera flexiguttalis Warren, 1896
Piletocera fluctualis (Fabricius, 1787)
Piletocera fulvalis Hampson, 1907
Piletocera hadesialis Hampson, 1907
Piletocera hecate Butler, 1886
Piletocera hemiphaealis (Hampson, 1907)
Piletocera holophaealis Hampson, 1917
Piletocera inconspicua Schaus, 1912
Piletocera inconspicualis Kenrick, 1907
Piletocera infernalis Hampson, 1907
Piletocera latalis (Walker, 1866)
Piletocera leucocephalis Hampson, 1917
Piletocera leucodelta (Meyrick, 1937)
Piletocera leucogastralis Hampson, 1917
Piletocera macroperalis Hampson, 1897
Piletocera maculifrons Hampson, 1917
Piletocera meekii (T. P. Lucas, 1894)
Piletocera megaspilalis Hampson, 1897
Piletocera melanauges Meyrick, 1886
Piletocera melesalis (Walker, 1859)
Piletocera mesophaealis Hampson, 1917
Piletocera metochrealis Hampson, 1917
Piletocera micralis Hampson, 1907
Piletocera microcentra (Meyrick, 1886)
Piletocera microdontalis Hampson, 1907
Piletocera nudicornis Hampson, 1897
Piletocera ochrosema Meyrick, 1886
Piletocera octosemalis Hampson, 1896
Piletocera orientalis (Snellen, 1880)
Piletocera penicillalis Christoph, 1881
Piletocera phaeocraspedalis Hampson, 1907
Piletocera plumbicostalis Hampson, 1917
Piletocera punctatalis (Legrand, 1966)
Piletocera purpureofusa Hampson, 1917
Piletocera quadralis (Snellen, 1901)
Piletocera rechingeri Tams, 1935
Piletocera reunionalis Viette, 1957
Piletocera rotundalis Hampson, 1907
Piletocera ruficeps Hampson, 1917
Piletocera rufulalis Hampson, 1907
Piletocera scotochroa Hampson, 1917
Piletocera signiferalis (Wallengren, 1860)
Piletocera sodalis (Leech, 1889)
Piletocera steffanyi Tams, 1935
Piletocera stenipteralis Hampson, 1917
Piletocera stygialis Hampson, 1907
Piletocera torsicostalis Hampson, 1897
Piletocera ulophanes Meyrick, 1886
Piletocera violalis Lederer, 1863
Piletocera violascens Hampson, 1917
Piletocera viperalis (Guenée, 1862)
Piletocera xanthosoma Meyrick, 1886

Former species
Piletocera litanalis (Walker, 1859)
Piletocera opacalis Rebel, 1926

References

 
Crambidae genera
Spilomelinae
Taxa named by Julius Lederer